Pissonotus brunneus is a species of delphacid planthopper in the family Delphacidae. It is found in Central America and North America.

References

 Bartlett C, Adams E, Gonzon A (2011). "Planthoppers of Delaware (Hemiptera, Fulgoroidea), excluding Delphacidae, with species Incidence from adjacent States". ZooKeys 83: 1-42.
 Bartlett, Charles R., and Lewis L. Deitz (2000). "Revision of the New World Delphacid Planthopper Genus Pissonotus (Hemiptera: Fulgoroidea)". Thomas Say Publications in Entomology: Monographs, vi + 234.
 Metcalf, Z. P. (1943). General Catalogue of the Hemiptera, Fascicle IV: Fulgoroidea, Part 3: Araeopidae (Delphacidae), 552.
 Van Duzee, E. P. (1897). "A Preliminary Review of the North American Delphacidae". Bulletin of the Buffalo Society of Natural Sciences, vol. 5, no. 5, 225-261.

Further reading

 

Delphacini